Enzo Monteleone (born 13 April 1954 in Padova, Italy) is an Italian film director and screenwriter.

Career 
Enzo Monteleone made his professional debut as a screenwriter with the screenplay of Hotel Colonial, an Italian-American co-production directed by Cinzia TH Torrini, and starring Robert Duvall, John Savage, Rachel Ward and Massimo Troisi. He has written four screenplays for director Gabriele Salvatores: Kamikazen, Marrakech Express, Mediterraneo, which won an Oscar in 1992 for Best Foreign Film, and Puerto Escondido, as well as films for such directors as Carlo Mazzacurati, Giuseppe Piccioni, Alessandro D'Alatri, Maurizio Sciarra and Carlos Saura (¡Dispara!, starring Antonio Banderas and Francesca Neri.)

Monteleone's first film as a director was a biopic of the actor Alessandro Haber, La Vera Vita di Antonio H., which was shown at the Venice Film Festival and which won the Italian Nastro d'Argento award for Best Actor.

The next film he directed was Ormai è fatta! (1999), which starred Stefano Accorsi and which was presented in competition at the 21st Moscow International Film Festival, received an award at the Annecy film festival in France, and was nominated for a 2000 Italian David di Donatello award.

In 2002 he directed the World War II drama El Alamein - La Linea del Fuoco, which won three David di Donatello Awards (Best Cinematography, Best Editing, Best Sound), and one Nastro d'Argento for Best Sound.

In 2004, he directed Il Tunnel della Libertà (The Tunnel of Freedom), a television film for Canale 5 starring Kim Rossi Stuart, based on the true story of two Italian students who dug a tunnel under the Berlin Wall in 1962 and helped thirty East German citizens escape to the West. In 2007 he shot another project for Canale 5, the six part TV miniseries Il Capo dei Capi. 

In 2009, he directed a comedy, Due Partite, written by Cristina Comencini and starring Margherita Buy, Isabella Ferrari, Paola Cortellesi and Marina Massironi and, in 2011, he directed a two-part TV series -- Walter Chiari - Fino all'Ultima Risata -- for Rai Uno, starring Alessio Boni and based on the adventurous life of the well-known Italian actor Walter Chiari.

Awards

Locarno Film Festival
2001: Pardo d'Oro for best film - Alla rivoluzione sulla due cavalli

Fice Award
1994: Award for best direction - La vera vita di Antonio H.

De Sica Award
2002: Award for best direction - El Alamein - La linea del fuoco

Filmography

Screenwriter
Hotel Colonial, directed by Cinzia TH Torrini (1986)
Kamikazen, directed by Gabriele Salvatores (1987)
Marrakech Express, directed by Gabriele Salvatores (1988)
Il prete bello, directed by Carlo Mazzacurati (1989)
La cattedra, directed by Michele Sordillo (1990)
Mediterraneo, directed by Gabriele Salvatores (1991)
Chiedi la luna, directed by Giuseppe Piccioni (1991)
Americano rosso, directed by Alessandro D'Alatri (1991)
Puerto Escondido, directed by Gabriele Salvatores (1992)
Bonus malus, directed by Vito Zagarrio (1993)
¡Dispara!, directed by Carlos Saura (1994)
Liberate i pesci, directed by Cristina Comencini (1999)
Alla rivoluzione sulla due cavalli, directed by Maurizio Sciarra (2001)

Director
La vera vita di Antonio H. (1994)
Interviste d'autore: Ettore Scola (1996)
Beer & cigarettes, short film (1997)
Wine & cigarettes, short film (1997)
Ormai è fatta! (1999)
Piazza Vittorio, documentary (2000)
Sono solo un artigiano - Intervista a Suso Cecchi d'Amico, documentary (2001)
I ragazzi di El Alamein, documentary (2001)
El Alamein - La linea del fuoco (2002)
Tunnel della libertà, TV movie (2004)
Il Capo dei Capi, 6 TV episodes (2007)
Due partite (2009)
Walter Chiari - Fino all'ultima risata, TV miniseries (2012)
Io Non Mi Arrendo (2016)

References

External links 
 

1954 births
Living people
Italian film directors
Italian screenwriters
Italian male screenwriters